The Balinese saka calendar is one of two calendars used on the Indonesian island of Bali. Unlike the 210-day pawukon calendar, it is based on the phases of the Moon, and is approximately the same length as the tropical year (solar year, Gregorian year).

Months 

Based on a lunar calendar, the saka year comprises twelve months, or sasih,  of 30 days each. However, because the lunar cycle is slightly shorter than 30 days, and the lunar year has a length of 354 or 355 days, the calendar is adjusted to prevent it losing synchronization with the lunar or solar cycles. The months are adjusted by allocating two lunar days to one solar day every 9 weeks. This day is called ngunalatri, Sanskrit for "minus one night". To stop the Saka from deviating unduly from the solar year as happens with the Islamic calendar an extra month, known as an intercalary month, is added after the 11th month (when it is known as Mala Jiyestha), or after the 12th month (Mala Sadha). The length of these months is calculated according to the normal 63-day cycle. An intercalary month is added whenever necessary to prevent the final day of the 7th month, known as Tilem Kapitu, from falling in the Gregorian month of December.

The names the twelve months are taken from a mixture of Old Balinese and Sanskrit words for 1 to 12, and are as follows:
 Kasa
 Karo
 Katiga
 Kapat
 Kalima
 Kanem
 Kapitu
 Kawalu
 Kasanga
 Kadasa
 Jyestha
 Sadha

Each month begins the day after a new moon and has 15 days of waxing moon until the full moon (Purnama), then 15 days of waning, ending on the new moon (Tilem). Both sets of days are numbered 1 to 15. The first day of the year is usually the day after the first new moon in March. Note, however, that Nyepi falls on the first day of Kadasa, and that the years of the Saka era are counted from that date.

Use 
Year numbering in the calendar is 78 years behind the Gregorian calendar, and is calculated from (its "epoch" is) the beginning of the Saka Era in India. It is used alongside the 210-day Balinese pawukon calendar, and Balinese festivals can be calculated according to either year.  The Indian saka calendar was used for royal decrees as early as the ninth century CE. The same calendar was used in Java until Sultan Agung replaced it with the Javanese calendar in 1633.

Notable days 
The Balinese Hindu festival of Nyepi, the day of silence, marks the start of the Saka year. Tilem Kepitu, the last day of the 7th month, is known as Siva Ratri, and is a night dedicated to the god Shiva. Devotees stay up all night and meditate. There are another 24 ceremonial days in the Saka year, usually celebrated at Purnama.

References

Bibliography 
 Eiseman, Fred B. Jr, Bali: Sekalia and Niskala Volume I: Essays on Religion, Ritual and Art pp 182–185, Periplus Editions, 1989 
 Haer, Debbie Guthrie; Morillot, Juliette & Toh, Irene  (Eds) (1995) Bali, a Traveller's Companion, Editions Didier Millet. 
 Hobart, Angela; Ramseyer, Urs  & Leeman, Albert  (1996) The Peoples of Bali, Blackwell Publishers. 
 Ricklefs, M.C; A History of Modern Indonesia, MacMillan, 

Specific calendars
Saka